Teulada may refer to:

 Teulada, Sardinia, a comune in the Province of South Sardinia, Italy
 Teulada, Spain, a municipio in the Province of Alicante, Valencian Community